Michael Storper is an economic and urban geographer who teaches at the University of California (UCLA), Sciences Po and London School of Economics.

Biography
Michael Storper completed a bachelor's degree in sociology and history in 1975, followed by a masters in 1979 and a PhD in geography in 1982 from the University of California, Berkeley.

In 2014 he was named by Thomson Reuters as one of the "World’s Most Influential Scientific Minds" of the 21st century for his writings being among the top 1% most cited in the field of social sciences. He is a fellow of the British Academy and in 2016 received the Founder's Medal from the Royal Geographical Society.

In a 2020 article co-authored with Andrés Rodríguez-Pose, Storper argued, contrary to most existing research, that zoning regulations have no impact on housing prices. A response piece to the article by several UCLA Luskin urban planning professors argued that the original article misrepresents existing research and draws faulty conclusions from data.

He lives in Los Angeles and Paris.

Books
1989 (with Richard Walker) The Capitalist Imperative: Territory, Technology and Industrial Growth, Wiley-Blackwell
1997 The Regional World: Territorial Development in a Global Economy, The Guilford Press
2013 Keys to the City: How Economics, Institutions, Social Interaction, and Politics Shape Development, Princeton University Press
2015 The Rise and Fall of Urban Economies: Lessons from San Francisco and Los Angeles, Stanford Business Books

Further reading

References

External links
Profile at the London School of Economics

Economic geographers
Urban geographers
Academics of the London School of Economics
Academic staff of Sciences Po
UCLA Luskin School of Public Affairs faculty
Fellows of the British Academy
Living people
Year of birth missing (living people)
Recipients of the Royal Geographical Society Founder's Medal
Recipients of the Vautrin Lud International Geography Prize
Corresponding Fellows of the British Academy